Chasia is a forested mountain range in the northern Trikala (Thessaly) and the southern Grevena (Western Macedonia) regional units, northern Greece. It is an eastern extension of the Pindus mountain range. The nearest mountains are the Antichasia to the south, the Kamvounia to the northeast and the Lygkos (northern Pindus) to the west. It is drained by tributaries of the Aliakmonas to the north, and by the Pineios and its tributary Mourgkani to the south.

Two municipal units were named after the mountains: Chasia, Grevena and Chasia, Trikala. Villages in the Chasia mountains include Kakoplevri and Oxyneia in the west, Agiofyllo, Trikokkia and Achladea Skiti in the central part and Asprokklisia and Kerasoula in the east. The Egnatia Odos motorway (Igoumenitsa - Ioannina - Kozani - Thessaloniki) runs west of the mountains, and the Greek National Road 15 (Kalambaka - Grevena - Kastoria) passes through the central part of the mountains.

References

Landforms of Grevena (regional unit)
Landforms of Trikala (regional unit)
Mountain ranges of Greece
Landforms of Western Macedonia
Landforms of Thessaly